Garmisch Classic is an alpine ski area in the Bavarian Alps of southern Germany, near Garmisch-Partenkirchen, Bavaria.

The area hosted the World Championships in 2011 and 1978, and alpine skiing debuted at the Winter Olympics here in 1936. Run only as a combined event in 1936, the downhill portion was run at Garmisch Classic and the slalom was run at Gudiberg, adjacent to the ski jumps (Große Olympiaschanze). Garmisch Classic is known for the classic Kandahar slope, descending from Kreuzjoch, where the speed events are held for the World Cup and World Championships.

Video
YouTube.com – a trip down the Kandahar course – 2012
YouTube.com – Didier Cuche wins 2012 World Cup downhill at Garmisch Classic (Kandahar 1)
YouTube.com – Lindsey Vonn wins 2012 World Cup downhill at Garmisch Classic (Kandahar 2)

References

External links
  - 
 Ski Map.org -  Garmisch-Partenkirchen - 6 maps
 Alpine Ski Maps.com - Garmisch-Partenkirchen
 GaP 2011.com  - 2011 World Championships - host site

Ski areas and resorts in Germany
Sport in Garmisch-Partenkirchen